Telstar 301 is an American communications satellite launched in July 1983 and operated by AT&T.  It was one of three Telstar 3 satellites, followed by Telstar 302 in 1984 and Telstar 303 in 1985.

The satellite served as the east coast home satellite for the ABC network from 1984 to 1993. The CBS network also used the satellite from 1985 to 1993. It also served as the first home of Fox Broadcasting Company until the late 1980s.

Other entities that also used the satellite included Group W, Wold/Keystone Communications (which used the satellite to feed Paramount Television's syndicated output including Entertainment Tonight, Star Trek: The Next Generation, and Star Trek: Deep Space Nine), Compact Video, Lorimar-Telepictures, and Warner Bros. Television.

The satellite was retired in 1993 and replaced by Telstar 401.  As of June 2009, Telstar 301 (along with Telstar 302 and Telstar 303) was still in orbit.

References

External links

 Gunter's Space Page - Telstar 301, 302, 303

Communications satellites in geostationary orbit
Spacecraft launched in 1983
Satellites using the HS-376 bus
Telstar satellites